The 2008 Team Speedway Junior Polish Championship (MDMP) is the 2008 version of Team Speedway Junior Polish Championship organized by the Polish Motor Union (PZM). The Final took place on 4 September 2008 in Alfred Smoczyk Stadium in Leszno. Championship was won by Unia Leszno. They beat defending champions RKM Rybnik and Złomrex Włókniarz Częstochowa.

Qualifications

Group A

Group B

Group C

Final 
 XXIX. The Final
 4 September 2008
  Leszno, Alfred Smoczyk Stadium

References

See also 
 2008 Individual Speedway Junior Polish Championship
 2008 Team Speedway Polish Championship (2008 Speedway Ekstraliga)

Team Junior